Washington County is located in the western part of the U.S. state of Maryland. As of the 2020 census, the population was 154,705. Its county seat is Hagerstown. Washington County was the first county in the United States to be named for the Revolutionary War general (and later President) George Washington. Washington County is one of three Maryland counties recognized by the Appalachian Regional Commission as being part of Appalachia. The county borders southern Pennsylvania to the north, Northern Virginia to the south, and the Eastern Panhandle of West Virginia to the south and west. Washington County is included in the Hagerstown-Martinsburg, MD-WV Metropolitan Statistical Area, which is also included in the Washington-Baltimore-Arlington, DC-MD-VA-WV-PA Combined Statistical Area.

History

The western portions of the Province of Maryland (including present Washington County) were incorporated into Prince George's County in 1696. This original county included six current counties. The first to be created was Frederick, separated from Prince George's County in 1748.

Following independence, the sovereign State of Maryland formed Washington County on September 6, 1776, by the division of Frederick County. At the same time, a portion of Frederick County became part of the newly created Montgomery County along with portions from Prince George's County and Charles' County, and was named for General Richard Montgomery. Washington County as created included land later to become Allegany County (created in 1789) and Garrett County (included in Allegany County when it was created in 1789, but separated from Allegany County in 1872). Washington County thus originally included the entire western part of the state.

A number of properties in the county are listed on the National Register of Historic Places.

Geography

Washington County is located in the Appalachian Mountains, stretching from the Ridge-and-Valley Country in the west to South Mountain in the east, which is an extension of the Blue Ridge.  Much of the county lies in the broad Hagerstown Valley between these two  zones; the valley is part of the Great Appalachian Valley that continues southward into Virginia and West Virginia as the Shenandoah Valley and northward into Pennsylvania as the Cumberland Valley.

The county is bordered to the north by the Mason–Dixon line with Pennsylvania, to the south by the Potomac River and the states of Virginia and West Virginia, to the west by Sideling Hill Creek and Allegany County, Maryland, and to the east by Frederick County and South Mountain.

Adjacent counties
Fulton County, Pennsylvania (northwest)
Allegany County (west)
Morgan County, West Virginia (southwest)
Berkeley County, West Virginia (south)
Jefferson County, West Virginia (south)
Loudoun County, Virginia (southeast)
Frederick County (east)
Franklin County, Pennsylvania (northeast)

Major highways

 Interstate 68
 Interstate 70
 Interstate 81
 U.S. Route 11
 U.S. Route 40
 U.S. Route 40 Alternate

 U.S. Route 340
 U.S. Route 522
 Maryland Route 34
 Maryland Route 56
 Maryland Route 57
 Maryland Route 58
 Maryland Route 60
 Maryland Route 62
 Maryland Route 63
 Maryland Route 64
 Maryland Route 65
 Maryland Route 66
 Maryland Route 67
 Maryland Route 68
 Maryland Route 77
 Maryland Route 144
 Maryland Route 180
 Maryland Route 418
 Maryland Route 491
 Maryland Route 494
 Maryland Route 550
 Maryland Route 615
 Maryland Route 632

Demographics

2000 census
As of the census of 2010, there were 147,430 people, 49,726 households, and 34,112 families residing in the county. There were 52,972 housing units at an average density of 116 per square mile (45/km2). The racial makeup of the county was 89.71% White or Caucasian, 7.77% Black or African American, 0.18% Native American, 0.80% Asian, 0.04% Pacific Islander, 0.46% from other races, and 1.04% from two or more races.  1.19% of the population were Hispanic or Latino of any race, 32.1% identified as being of German ancestry, 21.4% American, 8.8% Irish, and 8.4% English ancestry.

There were 49,726 households, out of which 31.30% had children under the age of 18 living with them, 54.00% were married couples living together, 10.70% had a female householder with no husband present, and 31.40% were non-families. 26.00% of all households were made up of individuals, and 11.10% had someone living alone who was 65 years of age or older.  The average household size was 2.46 and the average family size was 2.96.

In the county, the population was spread out, with 23.40% under the age of 18, 8.10% from 18 to 24, 31.30% from 25 to 44, 23.00% from 45 to 64, and 14.20% who were 65 years of age or older.  The median age was 37 years. For every 100 females, there were 104.50 males.  For every 100 females age 18 and over, there were 104.00 males.

2010 census
As of the 2010 United States Census, there were 147,430 people, 55,687 households, and 37,506 families residing in the county. The racial makeup of the county was 85.1% white, 9.6% black or African American, 1.4% Asian, 0.2% American Indian, 1.1% from other races, and 2.6% from two or more races. Those of Hispanic or Latino origin made up 3.5% of the population. In terms of ancestry, 31.7% were German, 14.1% were Irish, 9.8% were English, 8.5% were American, and 5.1% were Italian.

Of the 55,687 households, 32.4% had children under the age of 18 living with them, 50.6% were married couples living together, 12.0% had a female householder with no husband present, 32.6% were non-families, and 26.6% of all households were made up of individuals. The average household size was 2.50 and the average family size was 3.01. The median age was 39.7 years.

The median income for a household in the county was $52,994 and the median income for a family was $65,811. Males had a median income of $47,622 versus $34,225 for females. The per capita income for the county was $26,588. About 7.7% of families and 10.4% of the population were below the poverty line, including 14.1% of those under age 18 and 8.8% of those age 65 or over.

Communities

City

Hagerstown (county seat)

Towns

Boonsboro
Clear Spring
Funkstown
Hancock
Keedysville
Sharpsburg
Smithsburg
Williamsport

Census-designated places
The Census Bureau recognizes the following census-designated places in the county:

Antietam
Bagtown
Bakersville
Beaver Creek
Big Pool
Big Spring
Breathedsville
Brownsville
Cavetown
Cearfoss
Charlton
Chewsville
Dargan
Downsville
Eakles Mill
Edgemont
Ernstville
Fairplay
Fairview
Fort Ritchie
Fountainhead-Orchard Hills
Gapland
Garretts Mill
Greensburg
Halfway
Highfield-Cascade
Indian Springs
Jugtown
Kemps Mill
Leitersburg
Mapleville
Maugansville
Mercersville
Middleburg
Mount Aetna
Mount Briar
Mount Lena
Paramount-Long Meadow
Pecktonville
Pinesburg
Pondsville
Reid
Ringgold
Robinwood
Rohrersville
Saint James
San Mar
Sandy Hook
Tilghmanton
Trego-Rohrersville Station
Wilson-Conococheague
Yarrowsburg

Unincorporated communities

Appletown
Benevola
Broadfording
Burtner
Huyett
Pen Mar
Samples Manor
Spielman
Trego
Van Lear
Weverton
Woodmont
Zittlestown

Politics and government

Federal representation
The county is located within Maryland's 6th congressional district. The representative of the district currently is David Trone (D).

Like most of Appalachia, German-influenced and Unionist Western Maryland, Washington County is solidly Republican. The last Democrat to carry Washington County at a Presidential level was Lyndon Johnson during his 1964 landslide win over Barry Goldwater, although between 1888 and 1940 the county was a consistent bellwether for all Presidential elections.

|}

State representation
Washington County is represented by two senators in the Maryland State Senate. Member George C. Edwards (R), serves the 1st district in Maryland and Andrew A. Serafini (R), serves in the 2nd district. The county also is represented in Maryland General Assembly’s other primary division, the Maryland House of Delegates. Delegates who stand for Washington County include: Mike McKay (R) for District 1C, Neil Parrot (R) and William Wivell (R) for District 2A and Paul Cordermen (R) for District 2B.

County government
Washington County’s “leader” is known as the County Administrator. Currently, Kirk C. Downey serves as the Interim Administrator. However, Washington County's County Commissioners exercise executive powers as they exist in the government of the county.

The County Commissioners in Washington County comprise the traditional form of county government in Maryland. Current members include: Terry Baker (Vice President), Randall Wagner, Cort Meinelschmidt, Jeffrey A. Cline (President), and Wayne K. Keefer.

Economy
In 2000, the median income for a household in the county was $40,617, and the median income for a family was $48,962. Males had a median income of $34,917 versus $24,524 for females. The per capita income for the county was $20,062.  About 7.00% of families and 9.50% of the population were below the poverty line, including 12.30% of those under age 18 and 9.50% of those age 65 or over.

According to the Maryland Department of Business and Economic Development, the following were the major employers in the county (excluding post offices, state government, and local governments, but including public institutions of higher education):

Washington County is top in the state for commercial production of fruits, tree nuts, and berries.

Parks and recreation

National parks
 Antietam National Battlefield
 Appalachian National Scenic Trail
 Chesapeake and Ohio Canal National Historical Park
 Harpers Ferry National Historical Park

State parks
 Fort Frederick State Park
 Fort Tonoloway State Park
 Gathland State Park
 Greenbrier State Park
 South Mountain State Park
 Washington Monument State Park

Museums, historic sites, and other points of interest
Bowman House, Boonsboro
Crystal Grottoes, the only show caves in Maryland.
Discovery Station, Hagerstown
Hager House, Hagerstown
Hagerstown Roundhouse Museum, Hagerstown
Price-Miller House, Hagerstown
Springfield Farm, Williamsport
Stoney Creek Farm, Boonsboro
Washington County Museum of Fine Arts, Hagerstown 
Washington County Rural Heritage Museum, Boonsboro

Education
Washington County Public Schools administers public schools in the county. See Washington County Public Schools – School Directory for a detailed listing of elementary, middle, high, and other schools.

High schools

Public high schools
Antietam Academy, Hagerstown
Barbara Ingram School for the Arts, Hagerstown
Boonsboro High School, Boonsboro
Clear Spring High School, Clear Spring
Evening High School, Hagerstown
Hancock High School, Hancock
North Hagerstown High School, Hagerstown
Smithsburg High School, Smithsburg
South Hagerstown High School, Hagerstown
Washington County Technical High School, Hagerstown
Williamsport High School, Williamsport

Private high schools
Broadfording Academy, Hagerstown
Emmanuel Christian School, Hagerstown
Gateway Academy, Williamsport
Grace Academy, Hagerstown
Heritage Academy, Hagerstown
Highland View Academy, Hagerstown
St. James School, Saint James
St. Maria Goretti High School, Hagerstown
Truth Christian Academy, Hagerstown

Colleges and universities
 Antietam Bible College, Biblical Seminary, and Graduate School
 Hagerstown Community College, two-year public community college
 Kaplan College (formerly Hagerstown Business College)
 Mount Saint Mary's University, Hagerstown Campus, offers Master of Business Administration (MBA) program.
 University System of Maryland at Hagerstown, branch of the University System of Maryland; offers various associate's, bachelor's, and master's degree programs in connection with other state colleges and universities in Maryland.

Notable residents and natives
 See People from Washington County.

See also

National Register of Historic Places listings in Washington County, Maryland
Washington County Closed-Circuit Educational Television Project
William M. Brish, a leader of closed circuit instructional television in public school elementary classrooms.

References

External links

Washington County government
Hagerstown-Washington County Chamber of Commerce
Hagerstown-Washington County Convention & Visitor's Bureau

Washington County Free Library
WHILBR – Western Maryland's Historical Library
Washington County Free Library – Historic Newspaper Indexing Project
Washington County Museum of Fine Arts
Washington County Economic Development Commission

 

 
1776 establishments in Maryland
Maryland counties
Maryland counties on the Potomac River
Hagerstown metropolitan area
Populated places established in 1776
Counties of Appalachia